The Gunderson Historic District is a residential historic district in southern Oak Park, Illinois. The district encompasses 230 residential buildings built between 1906 and 1920, the vast majority of which are single-family homes. The development was the second of two built in Oak Park by S.T. Gunderson and Sons, a housing company which mainly worked in Oak Park and the West Side of Chicago. The firm commissioned architect Frank DeMoney to design their Oak Park houses; most of his designs used the American Foursquare style, a simple style which could be executed affordably. DeMoney differentiated the houses by applying elements of other contemporary architectural styles, such as Arts and Crafts, Colonial Revival, or Prairie School. The uniform design and layout of its homes made the district an early example of tract housing, which would become much more widespread later in the twentieth century.

The district was added to the National Register of Historic Places on March 1, 2002.

References

National Register of Historic Places in Cook County, Illinois
Historic districts on the National Register of Historic Places in Illinois
American Foursquare architecture in Illinois
Oak Park, Illinois